is a 1991 Japanese film by Akira Kurosawa based on the novel Nabe no naka by Kiyoko Murata. The story centers on an elderly hibakusha, who lost her husband in the 1945 atomic bombing of Nagasaki, caring for her four grandchildren over the summer. She learns of a long-lost brother, Suzujiro, living in Hawaii who wants her to visit him before he dies. American film star Richard Gere appears as Suzujiro's son Clark. The film was selected as the Japanese entry for the Best Foreign Language Film at the 64th Academy Awards, but was not accepted as a nominee.

Rhapsody in August is one of only three sole-directed Kurosawa movies to feature a female lead, and the first in nearly half a century. The others are The Most Beautiful (1944) and No Regrets for Our Youth (1946). However, Kurosawa also directed most of the female-led Uma (1941), on which he was credited as assistant director.

Plot
Rhapsody in August is a tale of three generations in a post-war Japanese family and their responses to the atomic bombing of Japan. Kane is an elderly woman, now suffering the consequences of older age and diminishing memory, whose husband was killed in the atomic bombing of Nagasaki. Kane has two children who are both married and both of whom grew up in postwar Japan. She also has a brother now living in Hawaii whose son Clark (played by Richard Gere) has grown up in America. Finally, there are Kane's four grandchildren, who were born after the Japanese economic miracle who have come to visit her at the family country home near Nagasaki in Kyushu.

Kane's grandchildren are visiting her at her rural home on Kyūshū one summer while their parents visit Kane's brother in Hawaii. The grandchildren have been charged with the task by their parents of convincing their grandmother to visit her brother in Hawaii. The grandchildren take a day off to visit the urban environment of Nagasaki. While in Nagasaki the children visit the spot where their grandfather was killed in 1945 and become aware, at a personal level, of some of the emotional consequences of the atomic bombing for the first time in their lives. They slowly come to have more respect for their grandmother and also grow to question the morality of the United States for deciding to use atomic weapons against Japan.

In the meantime they receive a telegram from their American cousins, who turn out to be rich and offer their parents a job managing their pineapple fields in Hawaii. Matters are complicated when Kane writes to Hawaii telling her American relatives about the death of her husband at Nagasaki. Her own two children, who have now returned from Hawaii to visit her, feel that this action will be viewed by their now Americanized relatives in Hawaii as hostile and a source of friction. Clark, who is Kane's nephew, then travels to Japan to be with Kane for the memorial service of her husband's death at Nagasaki. Kane reconciles with Clark over the bombing.

Clark is much moved by the events he sees in the Nagasaki community at the time of the memorial events surrounding the deaths which are annually remembered following the bombing of Nagasaki. Especially significant to Clark is the viewing of a Buddhist ceremony where the local community of Nagasaki meets to remember those who had died when the bomb was dropped. Suddenly, Clark receives a telegram telling him that his father, Kane's brother, has died in Hawaii and he is forced to return there for his father's funeral.

Kane's mental health and memory begin to falter. Her recollections of her lost spouse have never been fully reconciled within her own memory of her lost loved one. She begins to show signs of odd behavior in laying out her husband's old clothing as if her husband might suddenly reappear and need them to put on. When a storm is brewing, her mental health seems to confuse the storm for an air raid warning of another atomic bomb attack and she seeks to protect her visiting grandchildren by employing folk remedies, which confuse her children and especially her grandchildren. As the storm later intensifies again, Kane becomes more disoriented and mistakenly confuses the storm for the atmospheric disturbance caused by the bombing of Nagasaki which she witnessed visually from a safe distance when her husband was killed many years ago. In her disoriented state, Kane decides that she must save her husband, still alive in her memory, from the impending atomic blast. With all her remaining strength, she takes her small umbrella to battle the storm on foot on the way to warn her husband in Nagasaki of the mortal threat still fresh in her mind of the atomic blast which she cannot forget.

Cast 

Sachiko Murase as Kane (The Grandmother)
Hisashi Igawa as Tadao (Kane's Son)
Narumi Kayashima as Machiko (Tadao's Wife)
Tomoko Otakara as Tami (Tadao's Daughter)
Mitsunori Isaki as Shinjiro (Tadao's Son)
Toshie Negishi as Yoshie (Kane's Daughter)
Hidetaka Yoshioka as Tateo (Yoshie's Son)
Choichiro Kawarazaki as Noboru (Yoshie's Husband)
Mieko Suzuki as Minako (Yoshie's Daughter)
Richard Gere as Clark (Kane's Nephew)

Reception 
Rhapsody in August received mixed reviews on its release in 1991.

Some critics made much of the fact that the film centered on the film's depiction of the atomic bombing as a war crime while omitting details of Japanese war crimes in the Pacific War.  When Rhapsody premiered at the 1991 Cannes Film Festival, one journalist even cried out at a press conference, "Why was the bomb dropped in the first place?"  At the Tokyo Film Festival, critics of Japanese militarism said Kurosawa had ignored the historical facts leading up to the bomb. Japanese cultural critic Inuhiko Yomota commented:

"Many critics, myself included, thought Kurosawa chauvinistic in his portrayal of the Japanese as victims of the war, while ignoring the brutal actions of the Japanese and whitewashing them with cheap humanist sentiment."

Kurosawa's response was that wars are between governments, not people, and denied any anti-American agenda.

Chicago Reader film critic Jonathan Rosenbaum praised the film as "a beautiful reminder from octogenarian Akira Kurosawa that he's still the master...The pastoral mood and performances of this film are both reminiscent of late John Ford, and Kurosawa's mise en scene and editing have seldom been more poetically apt."

About the Japanese title 
The Japanese title (八月の狂詩曲 Hachigatsu no rapusodī) is also known as Hachigatsu no kyōshikyoku. "八月" means August, and "狂詩曲" means rhapsody. Both are Japanese kanji words. "狂詩曲" is usually pronounced "kyōshikyoku." When this film released in Japan, 1991, Kurosawa added furigana "ラプソディー rapusodī" to the word "狂詩曲" contrary to the standard usage of Japanese. So the correct romanization of the official Japanese title is Hachigatsu no rapusodī. But, often, the Japanese title has been cited without the furigana in various media. This is the reason why the misreading Hachigatsu no kyōshikyoku has become more widely known than the correct pronunciation.

See also
 Atomic bombings of Hiroshima and Nagasaki
 Hibakusha
 Japanese-American
 List of submissions to the 64th Academy Awards for Best Foreign Language Film
 List of Japanese submissions for the Academy Award for Best Foreign Language Film

References

External links

 Rhapsody in August  at the Japanese Movie Database

1991 films
Films directed by Akira Kurosawa
Films about the atomic bombings of Hiroshima and Nagasaki
Films about nuclear war and weapons
Films based on Japanese novels
1990s Japanese-language films
Films set in Nagasaki
Films shot in Nagasaki
Shochiku films
Films with screenplays by Akira Kurosawa
Films about widowhood
Anti-war films about World War II